Piet Hein was a  74-gun ship of the line of the French Navy.

Career 
Piet Hein, was one of the ships built in the various shipyards captured by the First French Empire in Holland and Italy in a crash programme to replenish the ranks of the French Navy. She was built in Rotterdam under supervision of engineer Alexandre Notaire-Granville, following plans by Sané and using timber taken from the 80-gun Piet Hein, taken apart while still on keel.

Royal Italien was surrendered to Holland at the fall of Rotterdam in December 1813. She was renamed Admiraal Piet Hein, and eventually broken up in 1819.

Notes, citations, and references

Notes

Citations

References
 

Ships of the line of the French Navy
Téméraire-class ships of the line
1812 ships